The Dillon County Courthouse, built in 1911, is a historic courthouse located at 301 West Main Street  in the city of Dillon in  Dillon County, South Carolina. It was designed in the Classical Revival style by Darlington native William Augustus Edwards who designed eight other South Carolina courthouses as well as academic buildings at 12 institutions in Florida, Georgia and South Carolina. Dillon County was created in 1910 and this is the only courthouse it has ever had. On October 30, 1981, it was added to the National Register of Historic Places.  It is located in the Dillon Downtown Historic District.

See also
List of Registered Historic Places in South Carolina

References

External links 
 South Carolina Association of Counties page for Dillon County 
 National Register listings for Dillon County
 University of Florida biography of William Augustus Edwards
 

County courthouses in South Carolina
William Augustus Edwards buildings
Buildings and structures in Dillon County, South Carolina
Courthouses on the National Register of Historic Places in South Carolina
National Register of Historic Places in Dillon County, South Carolina